Olesia Stefanko ((born June 25, 1988) is a Ukrainian lawyer and beauty queen who was crowned Miss Ukraine Universe 2011 and represented her country in the 2011 Miss Universe pageant, where she was 1st runner up.

Early life
Born in Kolomyia in the Carpathian region of Ukraine, Stefanko was named Miss Odesa National Law Academy in 2008 as a student at the Institute of Prosecution and Investigation.  She graduated with degree in Law from National University Odesa Law Academy in 2012 and planning to start her career in Kyiv prosecutor's office.

Pageantry

Miss Ukraine Universe 2011

Miss Universe 2011
The following September, Stefanko placed first runner-up at Miss Universe 2011, which stands as Ukraine's highest placement at any Big Four Beauty Pageant.

During the final question and answer portion of the competition Stefanko was asked a question and read by judge Miss Universe 2003 Amelia Vega of the Dominican Republic: "If you could trade lives with anyone in history, who would it be and why?", Stefanko replied:

References

External links
Official Miss Ukraine Universe website

1988 births
Living people
Miss Universe 2011 contestants
Ukrainian beauty pageant winners
People from Kolomyia
Ukrainian female models
Odesa Law Academy alumni